Atlantis Adventure is a steel roller coaster at Lotte World that opened in 2003.

References

Roller coasters in South Korea